The 3Station was a diskless workstation, developed by Bob Metcalfe at 3Com and first available in 1986. The product used a single printed-circuit board with four custom ASICs. It had neither a floppy disk drive nor a hard disk; it was booted from a server and stored all end-user files there.

3Com advertised "significant cost savings" due to the 3Station's ease of installation and low maintenance (this would now be referred to under the banner of total cost of ownership). The 3Station's cost lay somewhere between that of an IBM PC clone and an IBM PC of the day.  It was not commercially successful, nor were any of the similarly configured "low end" workstations that followed.

Typical customer for 3Stations 

3Stations's were sold as a package with a 3Server as a central hub.  The Australian Taxation Office (ATO) were a significant customer for this setup (through Groupe Bull subsidiary Bull HN, née Honeywell), eventually purchasing many thousand 3Stations and associated 3Server machines.  The network enabled the tax office to centrally control software versions from the Canberra office, distributing them Australia wide without the tedium and cost of updating thousands of independent, hard drive based PCs.

When the 286 processor became obsolete, the ATO opened a tender for replacement of the 3Station 2E with a suitable 386 based machine.  The tender process was eventually won by Bull HN with a product labelled "3Station/386", but only shared the external case as a common part.  3Com had very little input into the design other than supplying technical help and access to networking chip sets.  The internals were a custom designed single board based on the 3Com Etherlink II for networking, and ATI graphics.  3Station 2 and 3s were manufactured under license in Sydney until the contract ended.

References 

Computer workstations
Diskless workstations